Parnaíba–Prefeito Dr. João Silva Filho International Airport  is the airport serving Parnaíba, Brazil. It is informally known as Santos Dumont Airport because of its architectonical similarities with Santos Dumont Airport in Rio de Janeiro. It is named after a former mayor of Parnaíba.

It is operated by SBPB.

History
The airport is located on a privileged touristic area, near the municipalities of Camocim and Jericoacoara, in Ceará, the delta of river Parnaíba, in Piauí, and Lençóis Maranhenses National Park in Maranhão.

The airport was commissioned on October 19, 1971 and in 2004 Infraero became the administrator of the airport.

On November 5, 2021, the 32-year concession of the airport was auctioned and the winner was SBPB. On February 14, 2022 the contracted was signed and Infraero handed-over the administration of the airport to SBPB.

Airlines and destinations

Access

See also

List of airports in Brazil

References

External links

Airports in Piauí
Airports established in 1971
Parnaíba